The 2021–22 United Rugby Championship was the twenty-first season of the professional rugby union competition originally known as the Celtic League. It was the first season that the competition is referred to as the United Rugby Championship, having previously been known as the Pro14.

Sixteen teams competed in this season – four Irish teams: Connacht, Leinster, Munster and Ulster; two Italian teams: Benetton and Zebre Parma; two Scottish teams: Edinburgh and Glasgow Warriors (with Scottish and Italian teams in a shared regional pool); four South African teams: Bulls, Lions, Sharks and Stormers; and four Welsh teams: Cardiff, Dragons, Ospreys and Scarlets. It is the first season in which URC Regional Shields (Irish, Welsh, South African and Scottish-Italian) will be awarded as separate trophies to the leading sides in each nation or region.

Format
The tournament consisted of 18 rounds. There are four regional pools: The Irish Shield pool (featuring the four Irish teams), the Welsh Shield pool (featuring the four Welsh teams), the South African Shield pool (featuring the four South African teams) and the Scottish/Italian 'Azzurri/Blue' Shield pool (featuring the two Italian and two Scottish sides). Teams play six matches against their regional pool rivals home and away. The remaining twelve matches are made up by a single round robin, consisting of an even number of six home and six away matches against all the sides from the other pools. There is only one main league table (the conference system used in previous Pro14 years has been dropped). The top eight sides in the table will qualify for the quarter finals, followed by semi-finals and a grand final, with teams seeded 1 to 4 with home advantage for the lowest seeded side.

A total of eight sides qualified for the following season's European Rugby Champions Cup, while the remaining eight sides will play in the EPCR Challenge Cup. All points won in the competition contributed to rankings in the regional pools, with the top side in each regional pool automatically qualifying for the European Rugby Champions Cup. The remaining four places went then go to the highest ranked teams in the main table (who haven't already qualified). A similar format was used to determine playoff contenders in the Super Rugby competition. This will see the South African sides in the competition qualifying for a European competition for the first time (subject to finalisation of contract terms), as previous South African participants – the Cheetahs and Southern Kings – were ineligible for European competitions.

Teams

United Rugby Championship

Locations

Tables

URC – Regional Shields Pools Tables

The Regional Shield pools of the regular season are the primary mechanism by which teams qualify for European competition, with the 'Shield winner' of each regional pool guaranteed qualification for the European Rugby Champions Cup, ensuring at least one South African, one Welsh and one Irish side qualify for the premier European competition. As Scotland and Italy are sharing a single regional pool, at least one team from those two countries combined is also guaranteed entry, but neither country individually is so guaranteed.

The remaining four places will be awarded to those with the four best overall regular season records, regardless of which pool they take part in. As such, it is possible that a team will qualify for the ERCC without reaching the URC play-offs by topping its pool, but finishing ninth or lower overall; conversely, it is also possible that a team could win the entire URC championship from seventh or eighth seed in the overall championship table, but fail to qualify for the ERCC because teams below them topped their respective pools. Since each pool has only four teams, this means in effect that the top 6 in the overall table are guaranteed entry into the Champions Cup, with the final two places dependent on the placement of the two lowest ranked pool shield winners.

United Rugby Championship table

The overall United Rugby Championship table is the central pillar of the regular season, and the mechanism by which the teams qualifying for the Championship play-off bracket are decided. The top eight teams in the table at the end of the regular season, regardless of regional pool, qualify for the play-off quarter-finals, seeded in the order they finished the regular season.

The overall table also provides the secondary path to qualification for the European Rugby Champions Cup, with the four highest-ranked teams not already qualified as Shield winners gaining qualification.

Regular season

Round 1

Round 2

Round 3

Round 4

Round 5

Round 6

Round 7

Round 8

Round 9

Round 10

Round 11

Round 12

Round 13

Round 14

Round 15

Round 16

Round 17

Round 18

Play-offs

The play-off draw was seeded by final finishing position in the regular season table

Quarter-finals

Semi-finals

Championship final
The first United Rugby Championship Final was an all-South African derby, ensuring the first ever South African winner of the tournament, the Bulls having narrowly missed out on winning the transitional Pro14 Rainbow Cup competition. It also marked the first time in the history of the competition that a Grand final play-off match has not included at least one Irish province, a run of 14 finals.

Attendances by club

Highest attendances

End of Season Awards

URC Dream Team
The 2021–22 United Rugby Championship Dream team is:

Award winners
The 2021–22 URC award winners were:

Leading scorers
Note: Flags to the left of player names indicate national team as has been defined under World Rugby eligibility rules, or primary nationality for players who have not yet earned international senior caps. Players may hold one or more non-WR nationalities.

Most points

Most tries

Referees
The following referees have officiated at least one match during the 2021–22 season. Numbers in brackets denote the number of matches officiated during 2021–22. Correct as on fixtures played on 18 June 2022.

  Andrew Brace (14)
  Frank Murphy (14)
  Chris Busby (13)
  Craig Evans (11)
  Sam Grove-White (10)
  Adam Jones (10)
  Andrea Piardi (10)
  Ben Whitehouse (10)
  Ben Blain (9)
  Mike Adamson (8)
  Gianluca Gnecchi (7)
  Jaco Peyper (7)
  Marius van der Westhuizen (7)
  AJ Jacobs (5)
  Hollie Davidson (3)
  Nika Amashukeli (2)
  Aimee Barrett-Theron (2)
  Rasta Rasivhenge (2)
  Nic Berry (1)
  Pierre Brousset (1) 
  Eoghan Cross (1)
  Joy Neville (1)
  Gareth Newman (1)
  Christophe Ridley (1)
  Tual Trainini (1)

References

Notes

External links
Official website

2021–22 in European rugby union leagues
2021-22
2021–22 in Irish rugby union
2021–22 in Italian rugby union
2021–22 in Scottish rugby union
2021–22 in Welsh rugby union
2021 in South African rugby union
2022 in South African rugby union